Sheykhha may refer to:

 Sheykhha, Kohgiluyeh and Boyer-Ahmad, in southwestern Iran
 Sheykhha, Razavi Khorasan, in northeastern Iran on the Turkmenistan border